Woodvale is the southernmost suburb of the town of Southport, Merseyside, England.  It is situated between Formby and Ainsdale, to the north of RAF Woodvale. 

Towns and villages in the Metropolitan Borough of Sefton
Southport